Teav Aek is a 1972 Khmer film directed by Biv Chai Leang. The film stars Kong Som Eun and Vichara Dany. It is based on the Khmer novel written by Preah Botumthera Som, Tum Teav, which is widely considered the Khmer Romeo and Juliet.  This film was remade  in 2003 by Fai Som Ang as Tum Teav.

Plot 
A talented novice monk named Tum, Kong Som Eun, falls in love with Teav, Vichara Dany a very beautiful young lady. Teav give offerings to Tum  and he proudly accept the offers, which in the Cambodian tradition a young female is not allowed to engage in any close activity with a monk, that means even giving offerings is not allowed. As the story progress, the relationship of Tum and Teav escalates. Teav's mother is unaware of the relationship between the monk she respects and her 16-year-old daughter. No, Teav's friendly assistant, helps conceal the relationship of Tum and Teav from Teav's mother. As soon as Teav's mother finds out that  Tum is in love with her daughter she forbids her daughter from ever seeing him again. The story ends in a dramatic tragedy when Tum is killed and Teav commits suicide.

Cast 
Kong Som Eun
Vichara Dany
Nop Nem
Sek Bothoum
Or Dom

Soundtrack

References 
 

1972 films
Cambodian drama films
Khmer-language films